Sambuceto may refer to:

 Sambuceto (Bomba), a frazione in Italy
 Sambuceto (San Giovanni Teatino), a frazione in Italy